Bonnyville is a town situated in East Northern Alberta, Canada between Cold Lake and St. Paul. The surrounding Municipal District (MD) of Bonnyville No. 87's municipal office is located in Bonnyville.

The community derives its name from Father Bonnin, a Roman Catholic priest.

Geography 
Bonnyville is located on the north shore of Jessie Lake. The lake is an important staging area for thousands of migrating birds, and therefore attracts birdwatchers. Other nearby lakes include Moose Lake and Muriel Lake.

Demographics 

In the 2016 Census of Population conducted by Statistics Canada, the Town of Bonnyville recorded a population of 5,975 living in 2,281 of its 2,706 total private dwellings, a  change from its 2011 population of 6,216.

Population controversy 
The determination of the Town of Bonnyville's population has been subject to controversy since 2006. Most recently, Statistics Canada's February 2017 release of the population and dwelling counts from the 2016 census reported an overall population of 5,417, which was  residents fewer than 6,921 permanent residents the municipality counted in its own census conducted in 2014, and  less than the 6,216 counted in Statistics Canada's 2011 census. The population count as initially reported by Statistics Canada resulted in a change of -12.9%, which gave Bonnyville the distinction of being the municipality in Canada, among those with at least 5,000 inhabitants, that experienced the greatest percentage loss in population between 2011 and 2016. The Town of Bonnyville disputed the 2016 census results and conducted its own census in 2017 that counted a population of 6,422, which was  higher than the 2016 population published by Statistics Canada and  less than what the town had counted in 2014. Later in 2017, Statistics Canada issued a revised 2016 population count of 5,975 for Bonnyville,  higher than the originally reported population of 5,417.

Language 
Although English is the dominant language in Bonnyville, it is home to a notable Franco-Albertan minority. Its most common non-official mother tongues are Tagalog and Ukrainian.

Visible minorities and Aboriginals

Economy 
Bonnyville's economy is based on nearby oil reserves and agricultural resources, and benefits from its location between the markets of St. Paul and Cold Lake.

Attractions 
In celebration of Bonnyville's centennial year (2007), the town constructed the Centennial Centre, an educational and recreational centre, as an extension of the R. J. Lalonde Arena and the Bonnyville & District Agriplex. Its construction was somewhat controversial as its cost exceeded the original estimate and required a tax hike for both residents of the town and the municipal district.

Sports 
Bonnyville is home to the Bonnyville Pontiacs, a junior hockey team playing in the Alberta Junior Hockey League and also a senior hockey team, The Bonnyville Senior Pontiacs. The teams plays out of the R. J. Lalonde Arena, which is part of the Bonnyville & District Centennial Centre.
Bonnyville is also home to the Bonnyville Voyageurs a high school football team who play at Walsh field.

Government 

Bonnyville Town Council is composed of a mayor and six councilors, all directly elected at large. The current mayor, as of the 2021 election, is Elisa Brosseau. The offices of the Municipal District of Bonnyville are located within the town.

Bonnyville is located within the Bonnyville-Cold Lake provincial electoral district. The current MLA is Dave Hanson, the United Conservative Party , first elected in 2015. Previous MLAs include Genia Leskiw and Denis Ducharme.

Federally, Bonnyville falls within the electoral district of Lakeland, a newly re-created riding which is currently held by Shannon Stubbs of the Conservative Party, also first elected in 2015.

Financial institutions 
Options for banking services in Bonnyville include: Lakeland Credit Union, ATB Financial, RBC Royal Bank of Canada, TD Canada Trust and CIBC.

Education 
Lakeland Catholic School District No. 150 and Northern Lights School Division No. 69 operate public schools within Bonnyville.

Lakeland Catholic School District No. 150
École Notre Dame Elementary School (offering kindergarten through grade 4 English and French programming)
École Dr. Bernard Brosseau School (offering grade 5 through grade 8 English and French programming)
École Notre Dame High School (offering grade 9 through grade 12 programming and a great handball team)

Northern Lights School Division No. 69
Duclos School (offering kindergarten through grade 4 programming)
H.E. Bourgoin School (offering grade 5 through grade 8 programming)
Bonnyville Centralized High School (offering grade 9 through grade 12 programming)
Bonnyville Outreach School (offering grade 9 through grade 12 programming)

Conseil scolaire Centre-Est
École des Beaux-Lacs (French school offering kindergarten through grade 12 programming)

Media
Bonnyville is served by CKSA-TV-2 (VHF channel 9), a rebroadcaster of Citytv affiliate CKSA-DT in Lloydminster.
Bonnyville is home to 2 FM radio stations, Hot 101.3 FM (CJEG-FM), owned by Stingray Digital with a CHR/Top 40 format, and Country 99 (CFNA-FM) at 99.7 with a Country format, owned by Vista Radio.
Bonnyville is served by two local newspapers: the Bonnyville Nouvelle, which recently became a regional paper under the name of Lakeland This Week, features news from Bonnyville, St. Paul, Cold Lake, Lac La Biche, and Elk Point. Respect, launched in 2018, is a locally-owned regional newspaper "for seniors (and seniors-to-be)."

Notable people 
Denis Ducharme, former provincial politician
Tyler Ennis, professional hockey player
Justin Fontaine, professional hockey player
Ernie Isley, former provincial politician and mayor
Jon Kalinski, professional hockey player
Eugenia "Genia" Leskiw, Canadian politician, Progressive Conservative (MLA 2008-2015)
Tanner Boser, mixed martial artist

See also  
List of communities in Alberta 
List of towns in Alberta

References

External links 

1929 establishments in Alberta
Towns in Alberta